The following elections occurred in the year 1879.

Africa
 1879 Liberian general election

Europe
 Cisleithania (part of Austria-Hungary): election of the Imperial Council (details here) 
 1879 Portuguese legislative election
 Prussian House of Representatives
 1879 Spanish general election
 United Kingdom local elections (see here)

Bulgaria
 1879 Bulgarian Constituent Assembly election
 1879 Bulgarian parliamentary election

North America

Canada
 1879 Manitoba general election
 1879 Ontario general election
 1879 Prince Edward Island general election

United States
 1879 New York state election
 United States Senate election in New York, 1879

Oceania
 1879 New Zealand general election

See also
 :Category:1879 elections

1879
Elections